Glenn Ciano (born December 11, 1974) is a director, writer, and producer. His works include Homie Spumoni, Loosies, Inkubus and Infected.

Early life 
Ciano was born in Johnston, Rhode Island.

Career 
Glenn began his motion picture career at the age of nineteen, working in various areas of production on several films, among which are: Grind (Adrienne Shelley, Billy Crudup) Palookaville (Frances McDormand, Vincent Gallo, William Forsythe) Wishful Thinking (Drew Barrymore, Jon Stewart) American Buffalo (Dustin Hoffman, Dennis Franz) Outside Providence (Alec Baldwin). Ciano made his directorial debut with his film Inkubus starring Robert Englund and William Forsythe. He has gone on to direct Infected starring Michael Madsen and Christy Carlson Romano.

Glenn will be featured at Rock and Shock from Oct. 14th to the 16th with Robert Englund to premier 'Inkubus'' before an October 28 theatrical release of the film.  Check out facebook.com/InkubusMovie for information on purchasing tickets and theaters where the film is playing.

References

External links 
 
 
 https://web.archive.org/web/20111010223525/http://www.rockandshock.com/home.htm
 http://www.dreadcentral.com/news/47236/director-glenn-ciano-talks-inkubus-robert-englund-infected-and-more

Living people
1974 births
American male screenwriters
American film directors